{{DISPLAYTITLE:C4H8N2O3}}
The molecular formula C4H8N2O3 may refer to:

 Asparagine
 Glycylglycine
 Methylazoxymethanol acetate (MAM)
 3-Ureidopropionic acid

Molecular formulas